Stanley Arthur Hall (18 February 1917 – September 1999) was an English professional footballer who played in the Football League for Leyton Orient as a goalkeeper.

References 

English Football League players
English footballers
1917 births
1999 deaths
Association football goalkeepers
People from Southgate, London
Tottenham Hotspur F.C. players
Finchley F.C. players
Leyton Orient F.C. players
Yeovil Town F.C. players
Southern Football League players